Scoparia dulcis is a species of flowering plant in the plantain family. Common names include licorice weed, goatweed, scoparia-weed and sweet-broom in English, tapeiçava, tapixaba, and vassourinha in Portuguese, escobillo in Spanish, and tipychä kuratu in Guarani. It is native to the Neotropics but it can be found throughout the tropical and subtropical world.

Although S. dulcis is considered a weed in many parts of India and Bangladesh, its use in traditional medicine has led to overexploitation. The plant is also found as a weed in Florida citrus groves.

Traditional medicine
As a traditional medicine, S. dulcis has been used for diabetes in India and hypertension in Taiwan. In Siddha medicine it is used for treatment of kidney stones, but it needs rigorous diet method. It is called  kallurukki (stone melter) in 
Malayalam and Tamil. In Brazil, it has been used for various problems such as hemorrhoids and wounds.

Chemical constituents
Chemicals that have been isolated from S. dulcis include scoparinol. and epinephrine.

Gallery

References

External links
 

Plantaginaceae
Plants described in 1753
Taxa named by Carl Linnaeus